Elections were held in the organized municipalities in the Algoma District of Ontario on October 25, 2010, in conjunction with municipal elections across the province.

Blind River
Sue Jensen was elected as the first female mayor of Blind River, taking over 70 per cent of the vote to win over fellow town councillor Vyrn Peterson.

Bruce Mines
In Bruce Mines, incumbent mayor Darren Foster was defeated by Gordon Post, a town councillor whose campaign platform included a pledge to investigate the feasibility of amalgamating the town with the neighbouring township of Plummer Additional.

Dubreuilville

Louise Perrier defeated incumbent mayor Hélène Perth in Dubreuilville.

Elliot Lake
Incumbent mayor Rick Hamilton was re-elected in Elliot Lake. Following the election, Daniel Gagnon, the city's chief administrative officer, was forced to apologize to losing challenger Robert Whitehead for calling him a "smarmy dumbass" on Facebook; during the campaign, Whitehead had questioned whether the city needed a chief administrative officer at all.

Hilton
Former Hilton mayor Rodney Wood was returned to office by a margin of just one vote over challenger Jerry Shields.

Hilton Beach
The village of Hilton Beach was one of a number of municipalities in the district whose new mayor was acclaimed due to being the only registered candidate at the close of nominations.

Hornepayne
Morley Forster was declared elected in Hornepayne, winning over councillor Margaret Zajac.

Huron Shores
The township of Huron Shores was one of a number of municipalities in the district whose mayor was acclaimed due to being the only registered candidate at the close of nominations. Incumbent mayor Ted Linley ran for re-election as a council candidate in Ward 3 rather than as mayor.

Jocelyn
Incumbent mayor Mark Henderson was declared re-elected in Jocelyn over Sheila Campbell, who had previously run against him in the 2006 election.

Johnson
Challenger Ted Hicks defeated incumbent mayor Edith Orr in Johnson.

Laird
The township of Laird was one of a number of municipalities in the district whose mayor was acclaimed due to being the only registered candidate at the close of nominations.

Macdonald, Meredith and Aberdeen Additional
The township of Macdonald, Meredith and Aberdeen Additional was one of a number of municipalities in the district whose mayor was acclaimed due to being the only registered candidate at the close of nominations.

North Shore
Randi Condie defeated incumbent mayor Heather Pelky in the township of North Shore.

Plummer Additional
Incumbent mayor Beth West was re-elected in Plummer Additional.

Prince
Former councillor Ken Lamming defeated mayor Lou Madonna in the township of Prince. Lamming campaigned on his desire to keep the municipality's taxes "lower than everybody else in Algoma District". During the previous council term, Lamming had been involved in an employment dispute with the township, when the council fired him as chief of its volunteer fire department for leaking details of a workers' compensation claim to Sault Ste. Marie's media.

Sault Ste. Marie
In a race which was complicated by the death in office of former mayor John Rowswell on August 31, 2010, former city councillor Debbie Amaroso narrowly defeated sitting city councillor James Caicco to become Sault Ste. Marie's first elected female mayor.

The city is divided into six wards, each of which is represented by two councillors on Sault Ste. Marie City Council. In the 2010 election, there was one open seat in Ward 1, as councillor James Caicco ran for mayor, and one in Ward 3, where Bryan Hayes did not seek re-election as he had chosen instead to run for federal office in the 2011 federal election. All of the other 10 incumbent councillors ran for re-election. The remaining incumbents in Ward 1 and Ward 3 and both incumbents in Ward 2 were re-elected, while in the other three wards one incumbent won re-election but the other was defeated.

A municipal referendum to determine whether voters favoured allowing stores to open on Boxing Day was held concurrently with the election. Sault Ste. Marie is one of only a few cities in Ontario where a municipal bylaw prevents stores from opening on December 26; as in Sudbury, retail stores in Sault Ste. Marie instead begin their post-Christmas Boxing Day sales on December 27. Although voter turnout was not high enough to make the referendum legally binding, meaning that city council is free to disregard the results if it chooses to revisit the issue in the future, 60.77 per cent of voters opposed allowing stores to open.

Mayor

Councillors

Spanish
Incumbent mayor Gary Bishop was re-elected in Spanish.

St. Joseph

The township of St. Joseph was one of a number of municipalities in the district whose mayor was acclaimed due to being the only registered candidate at the close of nominations.

Tarbutt
The township of Tarbutt was one of a number of municipalities in the district whose mayor was acclaimed due to being the only registered candidate at the close of nominations.

Thessalon
Brent Rankin, who had previously served as mayor of Thessalon from 1985 to 1994, ran for another term as mayor after incumbent Donna Latulippe announced that she would not be seeking re-election. He won an overwhelming victory over challenger Jan Pawlukiewicz.

Wawa
Town councillor Linda Nowicki narrowly defeated incumbent mayor Howard Whent, becoming the first female mayor of Wawa.

White River
The township of White River was one of a number of municipalities in the district whose mayor was acclaimed due to being the only registered candidate at the close of nominations.

References

Algoma
Algoma District